James Finnerty (born 1 February 1999) is an Irish professional footballer who plays as a defender for League of Ireland Premier Division club Sligo Rovers. His former clubs include Rochdale, Bohemians and Galway United.

Club career
Born in Skryne, Finnerty signed for English Aston Villa from Irish club Belvedere in 2015. He signed a two-year contract with Rochdale in May 2018. After one senior appearance in the EFL Trophy, in December 2018 it was announced that Finnerty would sign for Bohemians for the 2019 season. Finnerty later said that part of the reason for leaving Rochdale was due to homesickness. In April 2019 he scored an "incredible" goal by way of an overhead kick. In March 2021 he was described as "a solid defender at the heart of the Bohemians defence". On 3 July 2022, it was announced that Finnerty had signed for Galway United on loan until the end of the season. Finnerty signed for Sligo Rovers ahead of the 2023 season.

International career
He has represented the Republic of Ireland at under-17, under-18 and under-19 youth levels.

Personal life
Finnery attended St Patrick's Classical School in Navan. His father Padraig was a Gaelic football player. Finnerty also played Gaelic football as a youth, as did his younger brother.

Career statistics

References

1999 births
Living people
Republic of Ireland association footballers
Republic of Ireland youth international footballers
Belvedere F.C. players
Aston Villa F.C. players
Rochdale A.F.C. players
Bohemian F.C. players
Galway United F.C. players
Sligo Rovers F.C. players
League of Ireland players
Association football defenders
Republic of Ireland expatriate association footballers
Irish expatriate sportspeople in England
Expatriate footballers in England